Jim Goodfellow may refer to:

James Goodfellow (born 1937), Scottish inventor
James Goodfellow (cricketer) (1850–1924), Australian cricketer
Jimmy Goodfellow (1943–2020), English footballer and manager
Jimmy Goodfellow (footballer, born 1938), Scottish footballer